Peter Cincotti (born July 11, 1983) is an American singer-songwriter. He began playing piano at the age of three. While in high school, he regularly performed in clubs throughout Manhattan. In 2003, Cincotti's debut album, produced by Phil Ramone, reached No. 1 on the Billboard jazz chart, making Cincotti the youngest musician to do so. This led to performances at Carnegie Hall, Lincoln Center, Radio City Music Hall, L'Olympia, Queen Elizabeth Hall, and the Montreux Jazz Festival where he won an award in the piano competition. Cincotti's style blends pop, rock, blues, and jazz.

Life and career
Cincotti was born in New York City. His father is of Italian descent, from Cervinara, a small town in province of Avellino where he is an honorary citizen. Cincotti started playing a toy piano at the age of three. While in high school, he regularly performed at clubs throughout Manhattan and performed at the White House. He graduated from Columbia University in 2005. At the 2000 Montreux Jazz Festival, he won an award for a rendition of Dizzy Gillespie's A Night in Tunisia.

His self-titled debut album is a compilation of traditional jazz songs, originals, and covers of classic songs ranging from the Rainbow Connection to Blood, Sweat and Tears's Spinning Wheel. His second album, On the Moon, featured more of the artist's own songs as well and new arrangements of American standards. Combining elements of pop, jazz, funk and, rock, his third studio album, East of Angel Town, features all original works and was released in 2007 in Europe and in January 2009 in the United States. This project began when Cincotti joined record producer David Foster (who signed him to a contract with 143 Records), producer Humberto Gatica, and producer Jochem van der Saag. He toured around the world, promoting the album with his single "Goodbye Philadelphia" and later joined Seal on tour in the U.S. In 2008, he collaborated with French DJ David Guetta and they appeared on the finale of Star Academy, performing Love Is Gone. Combining pop, jazz, rock and dance, Cincotti created his fourth studio album, Metropolis, produced by John Fields and released worldwide in the spring of 2012. In 2016, Cincotti released the EP Exit 105, followed by Long Way from Home on Oct. 13 2017, Peter's fifth studio album which he wrote, arranged and produced.

In July 2012, he and his sister Pia Cincotti wrote and produced the musical How Deep Is the Ocean? with music and lyrics by Peter Cincotti and book by Pia Cincotti. It debuted at the New York Musical Theatre Festival. In 2013 he participated in the Festival of Sanremo, singing the song La Felicità (The Happiness) with Simona Molinari. Later that year, Cincotti was named the first male ambassador for Italian luxury designer Tods and collaborated with the brand on the music video "Madeline", which was featured in the Italian edition of Vanity Fair magazine. In 2014 Cincotti wrote, arranged, and produced the soundtrack for the Italian film Le Leggi Del Desiderio (Laws of Desire) directed by Silvio Muccino.

Cincotti appeared in a small role in the 2004 film Beyond the Sea about Bobby Darin and contributed to the film's soundtrack. He had a small role as the piano player in the Hayden Planetarium in Spider-Man 2. His song December Boys is featured in the 2007 film December Boys starring Daniel Radcliffe. He appeared as himself in Season 3 (2015) of the Netflix series House of Cards, singing a duet with President Francis Underwood (played by Kevin Spacey). In April 2015 he performed with Sting and Annie Lennox at The Old Vic Gala in a tribute to Spacey.

He is a Dramatists Guild of America musical theater fellow and part of the Johnny Mercer Writing Colony at Goodspeed Musicals.

In 2017, he released the music video for his single, "Made for Me" which was debuted by People Magazine.

During the Covid-19 pandemic, Peter wrote and produced a song for New York called ‘Heart Of The City’, which was featured in Katie Couric’s ‘Get Inspired’ newsletter and TV shows such as Good Day New York.

In late 2020 and early 2021, Peter began work on his highly anticipated upcoming album ’88 Keys and Me’, which will honor some of the most influential piano men and women of all time, featuring songs by artists ranging from Scott Joplin to Lady Gaga.

Discography
 Peter Cincotti (Concord, 2003)
 On the Moon (Concord, 2004)
 East of Angel Town (143 Records, 2007)
 Metropolis (Heads Up, 2012)
 Long Way from Home (2017)

DVD and video
 Peter Cincotti: Live in New York (2004)

Chart history

References

External links
 

1983 births
American people of Italian descent
Concord Records artists
Horace Mann School alumni
Living people
Columbia College (New York) alumni
Singers from New York City
American male pianists
21st-century American singers
21st-century American pianists
21st-century American male singers
American jazz pianists
Jazz musicians from New York (state)